We Must Do Our Best (1909) is an American black-and-white film which featured Kenneth Casey and the first ever appearance of Moe Howard from the Three Stooges (In the film he played the bully, known as Harry Horrowitz). In the film Harry smacks the main character in his lower extemity with a tennis racket and calls him an effeminate fruit loop.

Cast
 Kenneth Casey
 Moe Howard - Bully (as Harry Moses Horwitz)

External links
 

1909 films
American silent short films
American black-and-white films
Films directed by Van Dyke Brooke
1900s American films